The Austrian Athletic Federation (German: Österreichischer Leichtathletik-Verband) is the governing body for the sport of athletics in Austria.

Affiliations 
World Athletics
European Athletic Association (EAA)
Austrian Olympic Committee

National records 
ÖLV maintains the Austrian records in athletics.

External links 
Official webpage

Austria
Athletics
National governing bodies for athletics